Nautica is an American apparel brand of Authentic Brands Group featuring primarily men's, women's, children's apparel and accessories, as well as home, watches, and fragrance. Nautica was founded in 1983 by clothing designer David Chu and a partner. It was purchased for cash and stock in 1984 by State-O-Maine, a New York–based apparel company. State-O-Maine changed its name to Nautica in 1994. VF Corporation purchased Nautica in 2003.

Nautica took its name from the Latin word nauticus—which comes from the Greek word ναυτικός—for naval and in Italian language nautica means seamanship.

In March 2018, Authentic Brands Group announced that they would acquire Nautica from VF Corporation.  The sale was completed on April 30, 2018.  Since being acquired by ABG, the brand has been repositioned downmarket as an upper mid-range brand, being priced above PVH's Izod and Ralph Lauren Corporation's Chaps brands, but well below PVH's Tommy Hilfiger and Ralph Lauren Corporation's Polo Ralph Lauren brands.

In 2020, ABG acquired, after bankruptcy and liquidation, the Brooks Brothers brand name only, another brand specialising in the preppy fashion category. In the ABG portfolio, Brooks Brothers name will continue to be marketed as an upscale traditional preppy brand, while Nautica will be marketed as a more affordable upper mid-price, modern athleisure brand.

In 2021, it was announced that  ABG would acquire the Izod brand from PVH, which offers several similar clothing styles to Nautica. Currently, Nautica slots above lower priced Izod and below upper priced Brooks Brothers in price.

References

External links

Official UK & Europe website

1990s fashion
2000s fashion
2003 mergers and acquisitions
2010s fashion
2018 mergers and acquisitions
Clothing companies established in 1983
Clothing companies of the United States
Eyewear brands of the United States
Manufacturing companies based in New York City
Sailing equipment manufacturers
Sportswear brands
Swimwear manufacturers
Underwear brands
Watch manufacturing companies of the United States
Authentic Brands Group